Pachypasa otus is a moth of the family Lasiocampidae first described by Dru Drury in 1773. It is found in southern Europe (including Italy, the Balkans, and Greece), Asia Minor, Armenia, Iraq, Iran and Israel.

The wingspan is 36–45 mm. Adults are on wing from June to September.

Recorded food plants include Cupressus, Juniperus, Thuja occidentalis and Quercus pubescens.

It was the probable source for Roman coa vestis, wild silk textiles from the isle of Kos.

Sources 

 P.C.-Rougeot, P. Viette (1978). Guide des papillons nocturnes d'Europe et d'Afrique du Nord. Delachaux et Niestlé (Lausanne).

Lasiocampidae
Moths of Europe
Moths of Asia
Lepidoptera of Israel
Moths described in 1773
Taxa named by Dru Drury
Silk